Gospel Church is a Protestant church situated on Dabei Upper Street, in the county-level city of Guanghan, Deyang, Sichuan Province. Founded in 1902, it was originally an Anglican church in the Szechwan Diocese of the Church in China. In 2003, a new church was built on Shuyuan Street, and renamed Grace Church.

History 

Gospel Church was founded by a Church of England pastor in 1902, belonging to the Diocese of West Szechwan. It is built in local architectural style, with a pseudo-Gothic door topped by a cross.

In 1929, Vyvyan Donnithorne, who was a member of the Church Missionary Society in China, together with his wife, arrived in Guanghan (then known as Hanchow). He served as pastor of the Gospel Church until 1949, before being transferred to the Canary Islands, Spain. During his stay in Hanchow, he became a member of the West China Border Research Society, and one of the key figures in the discovery of the archaeological site now known as Sanxingdui.

After the communist takeover of China in 1949, Christian Churches in China were forced to sever their ties with respective overseas Churches, which has thus led to the merging of Gospel Church into the communist-established Three-Self Patriotic Church.

Consecration of a new church took place in 2003. Unlike the original church, the new building was designed in an entirely Modernist style.

See also 
 Anglicanism in Sichuan
 Gospel Church, Wanzhou
 :Category:Former Anglican churches in Sichuan

References 

20th-century Anglican church buildings
20th-century churches in China
Churches completed in the 1900s
Churches completed in the 2000s
Guanghan
Protestant churches in China
Rebuilt churches
Traditional Chinese architecture
Modernist architecture
Buildings and structures in Deyang
Guanghan